Taylor Deupree (born April 30, 1971), is an American electronic musician, photographer, graphic designer and mastering engineer. He is most known for the founding of the 12k record label, along with his work as a member of Prototype 909, and his collaborations with Ryuichi Sakamoto, Marcus Fischer, Stephan Mathieu, Savvas Ysatis, Christopher Willits and others. In 2008, Taylor Deupree was the Président d'Honneur of the Qwartz Electronic Music Awards 5th in Paris (France).

Mastering engineer (2008–present)
Starting with simple mastering duties when he worked as the Art Director for Instinct Records in the late 1990s, Deupree's work as a mastering engineer became a steady job around 2008 when he relocated out of the city. He works in a purpose-built studio every day mastering music for clients of all genres, but often specializing in electronic, experimental, modern classical and other forms of alternative music.

Human Mesh Dance / Prototype 909 / SETI (the Instinct Records years) (1993–1997)
One of Deupree's early solo projects, Human Mesh Dance, which was begun in 1993 and ended in 1997 while he worked as the Art Director for Instinct Records was an ambient project that was a strong contrast to Prototype 909's more mainstream techno sound. He released three albums as Human Mesh Dance, along with appearances on numerous ambient compilations. Also in 1993, Deupree teamed up with Savvas Ysatis, a Greek electronic artist, to create several different projects, each with different sounds. SETI produced ambient electronica, with sounds and words from the various SETI projects from around the world. Futique was the duo's trip hop project, and its Detroit techno output was released under the Arc moniker. In 1996, the duo formed the short-lived label Index, which released only a single 12" EP, containing four tracks by various artists.

12k (1997–present)

Deupree founded 12k on January 1, 1997, based on the name of the first Arc album, 12k. On the name 12k:

12k publishes what Deupree refers to as minimalist electronic and acoustic ambient music, which often features a fragile blend of synthetic sounds, tape machines and a range of acoustic instrumentation.

Early productions by 12k were limited to between 500 and 1,000 units, partially because of limited storage space, and also because the small edition size increased the collectability of the albums. Since around 2001, editions became less limited but still started at between 1,000 and 2,000 copies.

Recent
Deupree has stated that he will be focusing on releasing solo music under his own name for the foreseeable future. He has done collaborations with several different experimental artists.

In 2022, Deupree acted as mastering engineer for Alanis Morissette's ambient album The Storm Before the Calm.

Bands
 Arc (with Savvas Ysatis)
 Drum Komputer (with Schoenemann)
 EOX
 Escape Tank
 Futique (with Savvas Ysatis)
 Human Mesh Dance
 OHIO ( with Corey Fuller)
 Prototype 909 (with Schoenemann, Szostek)
 Seti (with Savvas Ysatis)
 Skai (with Savvas Ysatis)
 Tiny Objects in Space
 Unit Park (with Schoenemann)

Collaborations
 Frank Bretschneider
 Richard Chartier
 Eisi
 Marcus Fischer
 Illuha
 Tetsu Inoue
Stephan Mathieu
 Kenneth Kirschner
 Christopher Willits
 Sawako
 Ryuichi Sakamoto
 Simon Scott
 Stephen Vitiello

Discography
 Freak Of Nature (1996, Tension)
 Bang Bang Machine (1997, Electric Music Foundation)
 Acid Technology (as Prototype 909) (1993, Sonic)
 Hyaline (as Human Mesh Dance) (1994, Instinct)
 SETI (as SETI) (1994, Instinct)
 Mindflower (as Human Mesh Dance) (1995, Instinct)
 Live '93-'95 (as Prototype 909) (1995, Instinct)
 Pharos (as SETI) (1995, Instinct)
 Transistor Rhythm (as Prototype 909) (1995, Sonic)
 Ciphers (as SETI) (1996, Instinct)
 thesecretnumbertwelve (as Human Mesh Dance) (1997, 12k)
 Joined at the Head (as Prototype 909) (1997, Caipirinha)
 Arc vs. Tiny Objects in Space (1997, 12k)
 Alphabet Flasher (as Drum Komputer) (1998, 12k)
 Tower Of Winds (1998, Caipirinha)
 Comma (1998, 12k)
 SPEC. (1999, 12k)
 .N (2000, Ritornell)
 Active / Freeze (with Tetsu Inoue) (2000, 12k)
 Focux EP (2000, Audio.nl)
 Polr (2000, Raster-Noton)
 invalidObject Series (continue) (2000, Fällt)
 Occur (2001, 12k)
 Tokei EP (2001, Audio.nl)
 Balance (with Frank Bretschneider) (2002, Mille Plateaux)
 Print EP (2002, Audio.nl)
 Stil. (2002, 12k)
 Invisible Architecture #8 (with Christopher Willits) (2003, Audiosphere)
 Post_Piano (with Kenneth Kirschner) (2003, Sub Rosa)
 January (2004, Spekk)
 Mujo (with Christopher Willits) (2004, Plop)
 Every Still Day (with Eisi) (2005, Midi Creative / Noble)
 Live In Japan, 2004 (with Christopher Willits) (2005, 12k)
 Post_Piano 2 (with Kenneth Kirschner) (2005, 12k)
 Northern (2006, 12k)
 Specification. Fifteen (with Richard Chartier) (2006, Line)
 1am (2006, 12k)
 Landing (2007, Room40)
 The Sleeping Morning (with Savvas Ysatis) (2008, 12k)
 Habitat (as Ando) (2008, Bine Music)
 Transcriptions (with Stephan Mathieu) (2009, Spekk)
 Shoals (2010, 12k)
 Faint (2012, 12k)
 Disappearance (with Ryuichi Sakamoto) (2013, 12k)
 Somi (2017, 12k)
 Fallen (2018, Spekk)
 Mur (2021, Dauw)
 Harbor (2021, laaps)

References

External links
 
 12k Records
 Official Web Page
 12k Mastering
 Taylor Deupree at Discogs

Interviews
 Textura , September 2010
 Taylor Deupree interview at Grooves Magazine
 In the studio with Taylor Deupree on Headphone Commute

American electronic musicians
1971 births
Living people